Ten individual competitors and six national teams qualified for the women's rhythmic gymnastics events at the 1996 Summer Olympics.

Individual all-around qualification

Final qualifiers

Preliminaries
In total, 37 gymnasts from 22 countries competed in the qualification round. The top 20 gymnasts advanced to the semifinal.

Semi-finals
20 gymnasts from 12 countries competed in the semifinal round. The 10 highest scoring gymnasts advanced to the final.

Group all-around qualification

Final qualifiers

Team rosters

Preliminaries
Nine teams participated in the preliminary round; the top six teams advanced to the final.

See also
 Gymnastics at the 1996 Summer Olympics – Women's rhythmic individual all-around
 Gymnastics at the 1996 Summer Olympics – Women's rhythmic group all-around

References

External links
 http://www.gymnasticsresults.com/olympics/og1996rg.html

Gymnastics at the 1996 Summer Olympics
1996 in women's gymnastics